Danckert is a surname. Notable people with the surname include:

 Jack Danckert (1922–2000), Australian rules footballer
 Peter Danckert (1940–2022), German politician
 Werner Danckert (1900–1970), German folk song researcher

See also
 Danckerts
 Dankert